Frafjord is a village and farming community in the municipality of Gjesdal in Rogaland county, Norway. It is located in the Frafjorddalen valley, at the innermost end of the Frafjorden, a branch of the larger Høgsfjorden. The village had about 100 inhabitants in 2001.

References

Villages in Rogaland
Gjesdal